Berardia is a monotypic genus of flowering plants in the family Asteraceae, containing the single species Berardia subacaulis. It is an alpine plant native to the Alps.

References

Cynareae
Flora of the Alps
Monotypic Asteraceae genera